Jiří Pokorný (born 27 November 1953) is a former ice dancer who represented Czechoslovakia. Together with Eva Peštová he competed at the 1976 Winter Olympics and finished in 11th place. Their best ISU Championship placement was eighth at the 1976 World Championships.

Competitive highlights

With Peštová

With Holá

References

1953 births
Living people
Czech male ice dancers
Czechoslovak male ice dancers
Olympic figure skaters of Czechoslovakia
Figure skaters at the 1976 Winter Olympics
Figure skaters from Prague